Lucas Grant Gilbreath (born March 5, 1996) is an American professional baseball pitcher for the Colorado Rockies of Major League Baseball (MLB). He made his MLB debut in 2021.

Amateur career
Gilbreath attended Legacy High School in Broomfield, Colorado. He was drafted by the Colorado Rockies in the 36th round of the 2014 MLB draft, but did not sign and played college baseball at the University of Minnesota. In 2016, he played collegiate summer baseball with the Hyannis Harbor Hawks of the Cape Cod Baseball League. He was again drafted by the Rockies, this time in the seventh round of the 2017 MLB draft, and signed.

Professional career
Gilbreath began his career with the rookie ball Grand Junction Rockies. In 2018, Gilbreath pitched for the Single-A Asheville Tourists, recording a 7-8 record and 5.04 ERA with 119 strikeouts in 116.0 innings pitched. He spent the 2019 season with the High-A Lancaster JetHawks, pitching to a 5-10 record and 5.81 ERA with 143 strikeouts in 28 appearances.

The Rockies added him to their 40-man roster after the 2020 season. On April 17, 2021, Gilbreath was promoted to the major leagues for the first time, however he was optioned down the next day without making an appearance. He was recalled to the active roster on May 1. He made his MLB debut that day, and pitched an inning of relief, but allowed a home run to the Arizona Diamondbacks’ Josh Rojas. Gilbreath was amongst the best Rockies relievers all season, posting an ERA of 3.38 in 47 games. He had 44 strikeouts in  innings. Gilbreath appeared in 47 contests for Colorado in 2022 as well. In 43.0 innings pitched, he posted a 2-0 record and 4.19 ERA with 49 strikeouts. 

On March 7, 2023, it was announced that Gilbreath would undergo Tommy John surgery, ending his season before it began.

References

External links

1996 births
Living people
Asheville Tourists players
Baseball players from Colorado
Colorado Rockies players
Grand Junction Rockies players
Hyannis Harbor Hawks players
Lancaster JetHawks players
Major League Baseball pitchers
Minnesota Golden Gophers baseball players
People from Westminster, Colorado
St. Cloud Rox players